Paramecosoma is a genus of beetles belonging to the family Cryptophagidae.

Species:
 Paramecosoma melanocephalum (Herbst, 1793)

References

Cryptophagidae